Saint Waltrude (died April 9,  688 AD) is the patron saint of Mons, Belgium, where she is known in French as Sainte Waudru, and of Herentals, Belgium, where she is known in Dutch as Sint-Waldetrudis or -Waltrudis. Both cities boast a large medieval church that bears her name.

Life
Waltrude was born in Cousolre in northern France, to a wealthy and influential noble family. According to Alban Butler, she was a sister to Aldegonde, foundress of Maubeuge Abbey. Waltrude married Vincent Madelgarius, the Count of Hainault. According to scholar John O'Hanlon, Madelgarius (or Maelceadar) was originally from Ireland. They had four children:
 Aldetrude, abbess of Maubeuge Abbey
 Landry of Paris, Bishop of Paris
 Madelberte of Maubeuge, succeeded Aldetrude as abbess of Mauberge
 Dentelin

After her husband retired to an abbey, she herself became a nun in 656. She founded her own convent (Sainte-Waudru) and the city of Mons grew around it.

Her biography celebrates her for "the pious intention under vow to free captives. She arranged the ransom price [pretium], weighed out the silver. ... When the captives had been bought back with the ransom money out of her own purse, at her command they returned to their families and homes."

The shrine of Saint Waltrude is kept in the Saint Waltrude Collegiate Church in Mons. Each year, as part of the Ducasse de Mons festival, the shrine is placed on the car d'or, a gilded cart, and drawn by horses through the city streets.

"Both her parents (Walbert and Bertille) and her sister (Aldegund) were canonized. Her four children were also declared saints (Landericus, Dentelin, Aldetrude, and Madelberte) and so was her husband (Madelgaire)."

References

7th-century births
688 deaths
7th-century Frankish saints
Female saints of medieval Belgium
Colombanian saints
7th-century Frankish nuns